Fritz Dupré was a London merchant of iron and manganese ores who became known as the "Manganese Ore King".

Early life and career
Friedrich Carl Cornel Philipp Dupré was born in Bad Soden-Salmünster, in the Main-Kinzig district, in Hesse, Germany on the 10th March 1862.  His parents were Wilhelm (Guillaume) Charles Frédéric Achilles and Ernestine Weisbecker. Little is known about his education and early life, but at the age of 31 he came to London and for the first two years he worked with the iron ore trader Herman at H. Borner & Co in Leadenhall Street.

In March 1895 he established F. Dupré & Co, dealing principally in iron and manganiferous ores from Greece and Spain for supply to the steel making industry. Refinements in steel required manganese ore with a lower phosphorus content and Dupré contracted to take almost the whole production of the largest Brazilian manganese ore mine, the Morro da Mina Mine, to sell in Europe and the USA. From 1900, India developed into a major source of low phosphorus manganese ore and Dupré introduced it into Europe and the US as "Oriental Manganese Ore". He had also continued as a trader in manganese ores from the Caucasus and following the Russian nationalisation of these mines in 1918, through a financial support deal with Russia's exclusive broker, Harriman, he strengthened his position in the manganese ore trade to such an extent that he became known as the "Manganese Ore King". In the 1920s he further cemented his dominance in the trade by securing the European sole selling rights for new mines in the British Gold Coast Colony.

Personal life

Dupré became a naturalised British Citizen in 1900. He married Magdalena Eva Elisabeth Hecker ("Else") and they had six children. The family's first home was 2 Clifton Hill, St John's Wood following which they moved to The Firs, a large 18th Century mansion, now listed Grade II, beside Hampstead Heath, near the Spaniards Inn. They also owned a large holiday house on the Esplanade in Frinton-on-Sea, Essex called Turret Lodge which had been used as a hospital during the Great War.

Dupré died at The Firs on the 9th December 1936 and was buried on the east side of Highgate Cemetery. His estate was valued for probate at £230,519, the equivalent of over £15 million today.

References

1862 births
1936 deaths
Burials at Highgate Cemetery
Naturalised citizens of the United Kingdom
People from Main-Kinzig-Kreis
Businesspeople from Hesse